Kristina Schmid (born 1972) is a Swedish photographer from Stockholm.

Schmid visited the Medborgarskolan art school in Stockholm from 1993 to 1994, and afterwards the Pernbys målarskola until 1996, also in Stockholm. From 1996 to 2001, she studied at the Valand School of Fine Arts in Göteborg, and participated courses at Munich's Academy of Fine Arts in Germany.

Exhibitions 
 1997:
 "Unga Tecknare", Nationalmuseum, Stockholm (group exhibition)
 "Tecknade Pärlor", Galleri Rotor, Gothenburg (group exhibition)
 1998: "Galerie Bar", Academy of Fine Arts, Munich (group exhibition)
 1999: "Begär", Fyrstads' project, Dårstugan, Vänersborg (group exhibition)
 2001: graduates' exhibition, Valand School of Fine Arts, Gothenburg (group exhibition)
 2003:
 Studio 44, Stockholm (solo exhibition)
 Liljevalchs vårsalong, Stockholm (group exhibition)
 2004: Liljevalchs vårsalong, Stockholm (group exhibition)
 2005: "and being confused is an exercise", Galleri 54 (Grupp 54), Gothenburg (solo exhibition)
 2006: art forum, Norrköping (solo exhibition; co: Jenny Granlund)
 2008: Liljevalchs vårsalong, Stockholm (group exhibition)
 2010: Galleri 1, Gothenburg (solo exhibition).

References

External links 
 artist's website
 Interview, Alexandra Hedberg

Swedish photographers
Swedish women photographers
Artists from Stockholm
1972 births
Living people
Academy of Fine Arts, Munich alumni